1985 in philosophy

Events

Publications 
 Nick Herbert, Quantum Reality: Beyond the New Physics (1985)
 Mou Zongsan, 圓善論 (Chinese; not yet translated into English) (1985)
 Bernard Williams, Ethics and the Limits of Philosophy (1985)
 Amartya Sen, Commodities and Capabilities (1985)
 Jürgen Habermas, The Philosophical Discourse of Modernity (1985)
 Between the Species (begins publication)

Deaths 
 January 19 - Eric Voegelin (born 1901) 
 April 7 - Carl Schmitt (born 1888) 
 June 12 - Helmuth Plessner (born 1892)

References 

Philosophy
20th-century philosophy
Philosophy by year